Daniel Leech-Wilkinson is a musicologist, who is Emeritus Professor of Music at King's College London.

He studied composition, harpsichord and the organ at the Royal College of Music, and then completed an M.Mus at King's College London specialising in 15th-century music. He received his PhD from the University of Cambridge, on the topic of 14th century compositional processes.

His publications include The Modern Invention of Medieval Music: Scholarship, Ideology, Performance (Cambridge University Press, 2002) and he co-edited The Cambridge Companion to Recorded Music (Cambridge University Press, 2011).

In 2019 he was elected a Corresponding Member of the American Musicological Society.

References

External links
 

Year of birth missing (living people)
Living people
Alumni of the Royal College of Music
Alumni of King's College London
Fellows of Churchill College, Cambridge
Academics of King's College London
British musicologists
English music historians
Alumni of the University of Cambridge
Machaut scholars